The following units and commanders of the U.S. and Spanish armies fought at the Battle of San Juan Hill during the Spanish–American War on July 1, 1898.

Abbreviations used

Military Rank
 Gen = General
 MG = Major General
 BG = Brigadier General
 Col = Colonel
 Ltc = Lieutenant Colonel
 Maj = Major
 Cpt = Captain
 Lt = 1st Lieutenant

Other
 w = wounded
 k = killed
 m = missing

U.S.

V Corps
MG William R. Shafter
MG Joseph Wheeler, second-in-command

Headquarters
 1st Squadron, 2nd U.S. Cavalry - Cpt. Thomas J. Lewis
 Companies C & E, U.S. Engineers
 Signal Corps Detachment

Spanish

IV Corps
Gen Arsenio Linares (w)
Gen José Toral y Velázquez

See also
 El Caney order of battle

References

Spanish-American War orders of battle